Kloten Balsberg is a railway station in the Swiss canton of Zürich and municipality of Kloten. The station is located on a variant of the multi-stranded Zürich–Winterthur railway line and is served by S-Bahn line S7. It is an interchange point between the Zürich S-Bahn and the Stadtbahn Glattal light rail system, which serves an elevated tram stop, adjacent to the station and connected directly to the station platform by an elevated walkway. The tram stop, which is named Bahnhof Balsberg, is served by Zürich tram routes 10 and 12, operating on behalf of the Stadtbahn Glattal. 

Line S7 runs every half-hour throughout the day, with services extending to Winterthur in one direction, and to Rapperswil via Zürich in the other direction. Tram route 10 runs between four and eight times per hour, depending on the time of day, with services extending to Zurich Airport in one direction, and to Zürich in the other direction. Tram route 12 runs four times per hour, with services extending to the airport in one direction, and to Stettbach in the other direction. Journey time to Zürich Hauptbahnhof is 15 minutes by train, and 33 minutes by tram.

The station was originally situated on the Wettingen–Effretikon line of the Swiss National Railway (Schweizerische Nationalbahn; SNB), which opened in 1877. This SNB became bankrupt in 1878. The line was then taken over by the Swiss Northeastern Railway (Schweizerische Nordostbahn; NOB), becoming part of their Zürich–Winterthur line. It has been part of the network of the Swiss Federal Railways (SBB) since 1902. Although the station is situated only  from the main terminal of Zurich Airport, it was bypassed by the opening, in 1980, of a new line directly serving the Zürich Flughafen railway station in the basement of that terminal. Since 2008, the Stadtbahn Glattal has provided a new direct route to the airport.

Gallery

References

External links 

Kloten Balsberg
Kloten Balsberg